Events in the year 1958 in Argentina.

Incumbents
President: Pedro Eugenio Aramburu (until April 30);  Arturo Frondizi (from May 1)
Vice President: Isaac Rojas (until April 30); Alejandro Gómez (until November 18)

Governors
Buenos Aires Province: Emilio A. Bonnecarrére (until 2 May); Oscar Alende (from 2 May)
Cordoba: Arturo Zanichelli (from month unknown)
Chubut Province: Jorge Galina (from month unknown)
Mendoza Province: Isidoro Busquets (until 1 May); Ernesto Ueltschi (from 1 May)
Santa Fe Province: Luis Cárcamo (until month unknown); Carlos Sylvestre Begnis (from month unknown)

Vice Governors
Buenos Aires Province: vacant (until 2 May); Arturo Crosetti (starting 2 May)

Events
February 14 – Prince Heinrich of Bavaria is killed in a car accident at San Carlos de Bariloche in the Andes. His body is returned to Bavaria for burial.
February 23 – In the 1958 Argentine general election, the Intransigent Radical Civic Union wins 47% of the vote, on a record turnout of 90.9%, while its leader, Arturo Frondizi, is elected to the presidency.
April 3 – Bill Haley & His Comets play the first of a series of concerts in Buenos Aires.
May 1 – Arturo Frondizi is inaugurated as President of Argentina.
June 27 – The Peronist Party becomes legal again in Argentina, three years after being outlawed.
November 18 – Alejandro Gómez resigns as vice president after being expelled from his party.

Films
See List of Argentine films of 1958

Births
July 21 – Liliana Bodoc, fantasy writer (d. 2018)

Deaths
 August 9 – Felipe Boero, composer (b. 1884)

See also
1958 in Argentine football

References

 
Years of the 20th century in Argentina